Christian Simmen (born 1899, date of death unknown) was a Swiss sprinter. He competed in the men's 400 metres at the 1924 Summer Olympics.

References

External links
 

1899 births
Year of death missing
Athletes (track and field) at the 1924 Summer Olympics
Swiss male sprinters
Olympic athletes of Switzerland
Place of birth missing